Wangping may refer to:

Wangping Township (王坪乡), a township in Ruyang County, Henan, China
Wangping, Beijing (王平), a town-level division in Mentougou District, Beijing, China

See also
Wang Ping (disambiguation) — for a list of people
Wanping (disambiguation)